The 2010 FIBA Europe SuperCup Women was the second edition of the FIBA Europe SuperCup Women. It was held on 18 October 2010 at the Maroussi Arena in Marousi, Greece.

Time
Times are CET (UTC+1).

Final

References

External links
 SuperCup Women

2010
2010–11 in European women's basketball
2010–11 in Russian basketball
2010–11 in Greek basketball
International women's basketball competitions hosted by Greece
Marousi